
Year 921 (CMXXI) was a common year starting on Monday (link will display the full calendar) of the Julian calendar.

Events 
 By place 

 Byzantine Empire 
 March – Battle of Pegae: Bulgarian forces under kavhan (first minister) Theodore Sigritsa defeat the Byzantine army at the outskirts of Constantinople. After the battle, the Bulgarians burn the palaces in Pegae ("the Spring"), and devastate the area north of the Golden Horn.

 Europe 
 Summer – King Henry I (the Fowler) defeats his rival Arnulf I (the Bad), duke of Bavaria, in two campaigns. Arnulf is besieged at Regensburg and forced to accept peace negotiations, recognising Henry as sole sovereign of the East Frankish Kingdom (Germany).  
 Landulf I, prince of Benevento, supports an anti-Greek Apulian rebellion, ravaging several Byzantine strongpoints as far as Ascoli. The Apulian nobility, professing loyalty to the Byzantine Empire, appoints Landulf as stratego of the Theme of Longobardia.
 September 15 – Ludmila, Bohemian duchess and widow of Bořivoj I, is murdered by her daughter-in-law Drahomíra at Tetín (modern Czech Republic). Ludmila will be canonised and become the patron saint of the Orthodox and the Catholic Church.
 November 7 – Treaty of Bonn: King Charles III (the Simple) and Henry I sign a peace treaty or 'pact of friendship' (amicitia) at a ceremony aboard a ship in the middle of the Rhine, recognising the border between their two Frankish kingdoms.
 A Hungarian mercenary force led by Dursac and Bogát defeats an army of insurgents, who plans to overthrow their ally, Emperor Berengar I, at Brescia.

 Arabian Empire 
 June 21 – A diplomatic delegation is sent from Baghdad to establish trade routes between the Abbasid Caliphate towards Bukhara (modern Uzbekistan). Ahmad ibn Fadlan, an Arab diplomat and traveller, makes contact with Almış, the İltäbär (vassal-king under the Khazars) of Volga Bulgaria, on behalf of Caliph al-Muqtadir.
 Battle of Sevan: Sajid forces under Yusuf Beshir invade Armenia and besiege King Ashot II near Lake Sevan. After gathering a small force he attacks Beshir's camps and drives the enemy out of the country. Ashot starts a counter-offensive to rebuild the ruined cities and fortresses.

 Africa 
 The Fatimid Caliphate crushes Idrisid forces in battle, capturing the cities of Tlemcen and Fez.
 The Fatimid Caliphate creates a new capital in Ifriqiya, al-Mahdiya on the Tunisian coast.

 China 
 The Later Liang Dynasty reports that all "barbarian" tribes have been pacified by the Khitan Empire.

Births 
 February 21 – Abe no Seimei, Japanese astrologer (d. 1005)
 October 9 – Li Chun'an, Chinese merchant (d. 999)
 October 27 – Chai Rong, emperor of Later Zhou (d. 959)
 Edmund I (the Magnificent), king of England (d. 946)
 Ja'far ibn al-Furat, Ikhshidid and Fatimid vizier (d. 1001)
 Louis IV, king of the West Frankish Kingdom (or 920)
 Ōnakatomi no Yoshinobu, Japanese nobleman (d. 991)

Deaths 
 February 13 – Vratislaus I, duke of Bohemia
 September 15 – Ludmila, Bohemian duchess
 Alexios Mosele, Byzantine admiral
 Elvira Menéndez, queen of Galicia and León 
 Harusindan, ruler of the Gilites (Iran)
 Lili ibn al-Nu'man, ruler of the Gilites
 Liu Xun, general of Later Liang (b. 858)
 Ragnall ua Ímair, Viking king of Northumbria
 Richard, duke of Burgundy (b. 858)
 Wang Rong, Chinese warlord (b. 877)

References